The 2010 season was Jeonbuk Hyundai Motors's seventeenth season in the K-League in South Korea. Jeonbuk Hyundai Motors is competing in K-League, League Cup, Korean FA Cup and Champions League as defending champions.

Current squad

K-League

Championship

Korean FA Cup

League Cup

Group stage

Knockout stage

Champions League

Group stage

Knockout stage

Squad statistics

Appearances and goals
Statistics accurate as of match played 28 November 2010

Top scorers

Discipline

Transfer

In

29 July 2010 — Cho Sung-Hwan move from Consadole Sapporo
30 October 2010 — Jeon Kwang-Hwan move from Gwangju Sangmu FC

Out

 27 July 2010 — Choi Tae-Uk move to FC Seoul
 29 July 2010 — Shin Kwang-Hoon move to Pohang Steelers (loan end)

References

 Jeonbuk Hyundai Motors website

Jeonbuk Hyundai Motors
Jeonbuk Hyundai Motors seasons